The 106th Cavalry Regiment (formerly organized as a group) was a mechanized cavalry unit of the United States Army in World War II recognized for its outstanding action. The group was organized in 1921 as part of the Illinois National Guard and during the Spanish–American War and World War I was known as the 1st Regiment Illinois Volunteer Cavalry. It underwent a number of reorganizations before World War II. Like other Guard units during the inter-war years, the 106th held weekly or monthly drills and yearly training. Readiness for war in 1940 led to the mechanization of the unit and induction into Federal service at Camp Livingston, Louisiana on 25 November 1940.

After the Pearl Harbor attack, the 106th trained at Camp Hood, Texas until the spring of 1944 when they deployed to Europe. Upon arriving in England, the group was reorganized into the 106th and 121st Cavalry Reconnaissance Squadrons along with a Group Headquarters. When they were moved to Europe, they were often in the lead of other units. Lightly armed, they scouted ahead to fix enemy locations. For the next year and a half, they fought through France, Luxembourg, Germany and Austria, earning five campaign streamers and two Croix de Guerre from Charles de Gaulle, President of the Provisional French government. The regiment led the Allied advance across the Rhine and were the first unit to attack a town south of the Siegfried Line or West Wall.

In late 2006, the 33rd Brigade Combat Team of the Illinois Army National Guard was formed and the 2nd Squadron, 106th Cavalry was included in the reorganization.

Pre-World War II 
Before World War II, the 106th Cavalry was a National Guard unit based in Chicago, Illinois. Prior to World War I and the Spanish–American War it had been known as the 1st Illinois Volunteer Cavalry. The 106th underwent a number of different reorganizations until 1 September 1940, when it was redesignated the 1st Squadron, 106th Cavalry (Horse-Mechanized). The 106th was inducted into federal service on 25 November 1940 in Chicago. The Regiment moved to Camp Livingston, Louisiana on 3 January 1941 under command of V Corps.

The Black Horse Troop 
From 1929 to 1940, Troop E of the Regiment was known as The Black Horse Troop and participated in parades and ceremonies as a horse mounted unit. Businessman Samuel Insull raised funds to outfit the Troop and their Mounted Band. The Troop wore a dress uniform of blue shell jackets.

World War II 
Along with other National Guard units, the regiment was federalized in 1940. At the beginning of World War II, most of the members of the regiment were given the opportunity to enroll in officers school. A core group of about 60 men chose to stay with the unit. The Regiment was assigned to the Third Army on 12 January 1942, and to IV Corps on 1 May 1942. In spring 1942 the Regiment became fully mechanized. The regiment participated in several maneuvers at Hineston, Kinisatchie, and Dry Creek, Louisiana; and in the Louisiana Maneuver Area through the beginning of November 1942.

They were assigned to XV Corps on 1 March 1943 and transferred to Burkeville, Texas, on 25 June 1943, after which it was sent to Camp Hood, Texas on 25 August 1943 under the Tank Destroyer Command. The Regiment staged at Camp Shanks, New York from 20 February 1944 until 27 February when it departed the New York Port of Embarkation for England.
 Constituted: 1921.
 Activated: 25 November 1940.
 Overseas: 1943–1945.
 Campaigns: Normandy, Northern France, Rhineland, Ardennes-Alsace, Central Europe
 Days of combat: 480.
 Awards: Fourragère-1 French Croix de guerre with Palm-2, DSC-1; SS-58; BS-519.
 Commander: Colonel Vennard Wilson, (25 November 1940 – 23 October 1945).
 Casualties: KIA-194, MIA-4, Wounded-499
 Returned to U.S.: 1 October 1945.
 Inactivated: 23 October 1945.

Subordination

Campaign summary 
The 106th served in the European campaign. The unit comprised approximately fifteen hundred men and was given various typical mechanized cavalry missions later recognized by the French nation with the award of two Croix de Guerre. The unit finished its wartime duty with the 7th Army, XV Corps.

As a forward cavalry force, the 106th provided the first American troops to enter Salzburg, Austria. The 121st Squadron of the 106th received information that the Germans were holding the King of the Belgians and his family prisoner in a chateau near Strobl, Austria. Captain Benning, the commander of B Troop of the 121st Squadron, led some cavalrymen of his unit, including those who spoke German, on a rescue party. The group later served as Honor Guards for the King of the Belgians and his consort. The 106th secured a truce from the defending German Army on 7 May, the day before the German High Command surrendered to the Allies on 8 May 1945.

Organization and tactics 
The 106th Cavalry Group's purpose was to act as the "eyes and ears" of a field army or army group, scouting ahead of slower and heavier-equipped armored and infantry formations to locate the enemy and shield friendly units from ground detection. Whenever enemy forces were found, the cavalry was designed to determine opposing size and positions using reconnaissance-by-fire tactics, and report this information to higher command. The group was too lightly armed to engage in sustained combat, and regular infantry or armor was utilized if the opposition proved beyond cavalry-group capabilities. Another routine aspect of its reconnaissance duties involved employment of the cavalry group to fill measurable gaps separating frontline Allied units. The cavalry group was also assigned missions requiring rapid movement to bypass enemy forces, if opportune weaknesses or uncovered terrain was discovered by mechanized reconnaissance methods.

Equipment and armament 

The 106th Cavalry was lightly equipped to allow it to move quickly and deploy rapidly. They fought mounted in mobile Bantam Jeeps and M8 armored cars. Each squadron's complement of troops and vehicles consisted of a headquarters troop that included communication, administrative, mess, maintenance, transportation, and supply support, a medical detachment, a cavalry assault gun troop, and three reconnaissance troops, lettered A, B, and C. A squadron of about 760 men was about the equivalent of a typical Army battalion in numbers, though Cavalry units were typically smaller.

The three reconnaissance troops were each equipped with Bantam jeeps with a bracket-mounted .30 caliber machine gun, manned by a soldier sitting in the front passenger seat. A second Bantam jeep was mounted with a 60mm mortar manned by two soldiers. Sometimes the Bantam was mounted with a .50 caliber machine gun. Each troop was usually equipped with a mixture of the three vehicles. To maximize speed and maneuverability on the battlefield, the Bantams were not given extra armor protection. The only modifications the 106th made was to add a wire cutter. They mounted a steel pole on the front bumper that extended above the driver's head because the Germans would sometimes stretch piano wire over roads with the intention of injuring or decapitating the driver.

The third vehicle used was the six-wheeled, light-weight M8 Greyhound armored car, mounted with a 37 mm gun in a movable turret that could swing a full 360 degrees. It also featured a .30 caliber coaxial machine gun that could move independently of the turret. The M8 was equipped with powerful FM radios to enable battlefield communications.

E Troop, the Squadron's mobile artillery, was the Cavalry Assault Gun Troop and consisted of three assault gun platoons. Each platoon was equipped with assault guns, short-barreled  howitzers in an open turret on an M8 chassis. They also utilized two halftracks to carry their headquarters unit and an ammunition section. Two gun sections used an M8 Greyhound.

F Troop consisted of five light tank companies. Early in the war, each company had three light tank platoons, consisting of five 37mm M5A1 Stuart light tanks. While fast and maneuverable, the Stuart's armor plating and its cannon were soon found to be no match against the German tanks. In February 1945, they were replaced with the more heavily armed 75 mm M24 Chaffee light tank.

The officers usually rode with their enlisted men in the Bantams, while the squadron's support troops used a variety of vehicles including the Bantams, military trucks, and armored halftracks. At times, the men would dismount from their light vehicles and take on infantry roles, digging in to create a stronger defensive line.

Patrols were undertaken both on foot or mounted as the circumstances dictated. In this capacity, the cavalrymen would go into combat with M1 rifles and carbines, hand grenades, Thompson machine guns, and newly developed bazookas. When facing heavily fortified enemy positions or, later in the war, against the heaviest German tanks, the 106th was accompanied with supporting units, usually in the form of a small number of tank destroyers. However, the mission of reconnaissance units was not to fully engage the enemy when encountered, but to summon the slower moving and better equipped infantry and armored units to take on their counterparts.

The headquarters, maintenance, mess, supply and medical units were equipped with a variety of military trucks, M8 Armored cars, halftracks, and Bantam jeeps.

Arrival in England 
The regiment arrived at Glasgow, Scotland on 9 March 1944, was moved to Doddington Hall camp in England, and six days later was reorganized as the HHT 106th Cavalry Group (Mechanized), comprising the 106th and 121st Cavalry Reconnaissance Squadrons along with a Group Headquarters. Half of its officers and non-commissioned soldiers formed the basis of the newly created 121st Cavalry Squadron. The 33rd Aviation Battalion of the Illinois National Guard was reorganized as Troop A. After three months of training, the 106th sailed for France on 29 June 1944. While crossing the English Channel to the Normandy beach, the Squadron was transported on two Liberty ships. The U.S. James A. Ferrell, the Liberty ship carrying Troop A of the 121st Squadron, was struck by a torpedo from German U-boat 984 shortly after leaving England killing four American soldiers below deck and wounding another 45 men. Fortunately, a Red Cross LST came quickly alongside and the rest of the men were safely evacuated back to England for another 19 days before new transportation to France could be found.

European operations 
The cavalry group served in the European campaign and at various stages screened the advance of the US Third Army, US Seventh Army and US Sixth Army Group. The 106th as a scouting force provided the first American troops to enter Salzburg, Austria and accepted its surrender.

Normandy 

The 106th Cavalry Group arrived in France under the command of Colonel Vennard Wilson, a Regular Army officer. They were first committed to combat on 2 July 1944 with the VIII Corps. Its first mission was to assist in the reduction of German forces previously isolated during the VIII Corps advance in the Normandy Peninsula. The next mission was an offensive screening mission, which led from Normandy south through St. James, Isigny, La Haye-du-Puits, Manche, Basse-Normandie, Coutance, and Avranches, to Rennes. With the quick advance, gaps appeared between VIII and XV Corps, and General George S. Patton plugged the gap between Louvigne and Rennes with the 106th Cavalry Group.

When VIII Corps turned west to mop up and secure the Brittany Peninsula, the 106th Regiment was reassigned once again to XV Corps. As the XV Corps raced east towards Le Mans, the 106th provided reconnaissance and a screening force. Members of the 106th were among the first to enter Le Mans on 8 August. The German front in the Battle of Normandy had collapsed, and the XV Corps turned north to help close the Falaise Pocket and the 106th provided flank screening security.

Northern France 
The XV Corps then turned north towards the Seine and Paris. With the pocket closed, the 106th reconnoitered east through Alençon, Sarthe, Nogent, and Mantes-Gassicourt. They remained there covering the XV Corps' flank until 27 August. This mission helped protect XV Corps against German remnants attempting to escape the Falaise Pocket. The advance east from Auxerre to Gondrecourt was very fast against diminishing German resistance. Their screening mission took them along a  front from the left to the right flank of the Third Army.

The group was then transferred under the command of and assigned to protect the right flank of XII Corps for twelve days carrying out reconnaissance as that corps advanced east. In mid-September it was reassigned to XV Corps at Joinville. This marked a two-month and  trek across France as they moved in to protect the right flank of U.S. Third Army during their rapid advance from Joinville au Marne to Charmes au Moselle. During this advance, the 106th along with the 2nd French Armored Division assisted in eradicating the effective combat power of the German 16th Infantry Division.

The 106th's commanding officer, Colonel Vennard Wilson, later described the unit's action:

Eastern France 

In late September, the U.S. Army transferred the XV Corps from General Patton's Third Army, 12th Army Group to Seventh Army, 6th Army Group. Reassigned with the XV Corps, the 106th—without moving positions—switched from guarding the Third Army's right flank to guarding the Seventh Army's left flank and maintaining contact between the Third and Seventh Armies.

The 106th was then tasked with reconnaissance in front of the XV Corps. They led the XV Corps from the Moselle River to Lunéville, and supported by the 813th Tank Destroyer Battalion, attacked northeast into the Forêt de Parroy, northeast of Lunéville, France. For two months they fought as infantrymen, dismounted alongside the 79th and 44th Infantry Divisions, enduring winter weather and minefields. Major General Wade H. Haislip characterized Forêt de Parroy as being "in reality a jungle."

Staying in contact with the XII Corps right flank to its north was difficult because its lines were so thinly spread. Maintaining relatively static lines from 20 September through 5 November, they took the opportunity to rotate the two squadrons in and out of the line as trench foot took its toll on the soldiers. On several occasions the 106th was ordered to counter German probing attacks. The 121st Cavalry Squadron was later awarded the Croix de Guerre with Palm for its combat participation during this extended period.

When the XV Corps' infantry attacked the German defensive line, the 106th, once again supported by the 813th Tank Destroyer Battalion, preceded the 2nd French Armored Division in maneuvering through the Vosges Mountains to within  of the Rhine River. The 106th screened the north advance, leading the attack on Sarrebourg and then advancing  to the east to seize the Saverne Gap. Once through the Gap, the 106th guarded the northwest flank near Sarrebourg as the rest of the Corps advanced east another  to capture Strasbourg.

On the American's Thanksgiving Day, 23 November 1944, one of the most élite units in the entire German army, the well-rested and refitted Panzer-Lehr-Division counterattacked, trying to recapture the Saverne Gap and cut off the XV Corps from its supply lines. The 106th was forced back (militarily credited with the usual propaganda of "completing a brilliant delaying action") but the retreat gave XV Corps Commander Major General Wade H. Haislip enough time to reinforce and the counter German advance.

Two weeks later, on 16 December 1944, the Germans launched the Ardennes Offensive (Battle of the Bulge). The 106th was placed in a dismounted (infantry) patrol mode north of Sarrebourg to scout German forces.

On 23 December the Group relieved the 6th Cavalry Group of Third Army in its zone to the north. The 106th Squadron relieved the 28th Squadron near St. Avold and the 121st Squadron relieved the 6th Squadron near Freyming-Merlebach. The 106th Cavalry Group maintained position on the shoulder of the bulge, helping maintain contact with Third Army and check the German attack.

Operation Nordwind 
As the Ardennes Offensive faltered, the Germans launched Operation Nordwind in the Alsace just before midnight on New Year's Eve to try to relieve pressure on its troops in the Ardennes. They once again sought to recapture the Saverne Gap and join up with the German 19th Army, enveloping seven American divisions along the Rhine River. The Germans attacked the right center of the Regiment and the group temporarily withdrew. The bitterly cold winter weather made fighting more difficult, but the 106th finally forced the Germans to retreat.

When Nordwind was stopped on 28 January 1945, the Seventh Army and the French First Army resumed the offensive the following day. The 106th continued to patrol until 11 February 1945, when it was relieved by the 101st Cavalry Group. The regiment moved outside of Merlebach for rest, refitting, and equipment maintenance. They were outfitted with the new M-24 'Chaffee' light tank with its improved 75 mm gun mount, a huge improvement over the M5A1's 37 mm gun. Upon receiving the tanks in mid-February 1945, soldiers said, "The light tank companies of both squadrons turned in their 37 mm gun-toting M5A1's and drew the new M24's Armed with a 75 mm cannon and twice the size of the precursors, these tanks seemed beautiful to us. Our tankers itched to try them out. On 15 March, they got their chance. We were back in the line."

Rhineland 

After just over a month's break, the 106th Cavalry Group returned to the front lines. From 15 to 26 March it led XV Corps' offensive through the Siegfried Line near Saarbrücken. Leading the advance across the Rhine were A and B Troops of the 121st Squadron, the first to attack a town south of the West Wall. Finally reaching the Rhine River, on 27 March 1945 the 106th crossed the river and cleared and secured Salzbach. The Group then covered the advance of XV Corps to Aschaffenburg am Main. The 106th secured the Corps' left flank and maintained contact with the 44th and 45th Infantry Divisions and the 2nd Cavalry Division.

From 1 to 5 April, the regiment assisted the 2nd Cavalry Group, advancing north to Bad Orb, Germany and secured an Allied Prisoner of War camp. The Regiment's 121st Squadron was then charged with reconnoitering the main road to Neustadt.

In the next eight days, the group moved northeast into Germany, rapidly cleared the towns of Alsberg, Siedensroth, Steinau, Schlüchtern and Flieden. From 5 to 13 April, the regiment cleared the enemy eastward to the Main River, a tributary of the Rhine River, covering the advance of the 45th Infantry Division into Lauda-Königshofen and then on 20 April the capture of Nuremberg.

During the next two days, the 106th Cavalry Group fought its final major engagement. From Neuberg, the unit attacked southward towards Augsburg. Leading the 45th Infantry Division rapidly east  down the autobahn towards Munich as it tried to locate the rapidly retreating Germans, Troop C along with two light tanks from Company F, drew a concentrated attack from German forces only  from their objective. The German self-propelled guns, tanks, and small arms fire left four dead and destroyed four armored M8 vehicles and four Bantams.

On 29 April, during the assault towards Munich, the 3rd Battalion, 157th Infantry Regiment, 45th Division liberated the Dachau Concentration Camp. The 45th Infantry Division for which the 106th had reconnoitered for several months, battled diehard Nazi troops and took Munich on 30 April 1945. After helping to capture Munich, the 106th lead the XV Corps into Austria. On 2 May, they received orders to capture Salzburg. En route, they captured the remnants of the Hungarian 9th Infantry Brigade, about 8,800 men, who were retreating eastward, fighting the advancing Soviet Marshal Rodion Malinovsky's 2nd Ukrainian Front. Salzburg surrendered on 4 May, and the local German commander offered a truce.

Austria 
The group's final mission involved the release of the King of the Belgians. Held in internal exile by the Germans since his small nation had withstood a German attack for three weeks in May 1940, German-speaking members of a small recon party from B Troop, 121st Squadron of the 106th learned while searching the towns of St. Wolfgang and Strobl that King Leopold was under guard in a villa in Strobl. Travelling in a six-wheeled Mercedes previously owned by Germany's Foreign Minister Von Ribbentrop, the troopers located the villa. The SS Guards were still present, and the troopers disarmed them without any resistance, freeing King Leopold.

Decorations 

Colonel Vennard Wilson was awarded the Legion of Merit, Legion of Honor, and Croix de Guerre for his outstanding leadership of this unit. Lieutenant Benjamin S. Hill, C Troop, 121st Squadron, was posthumously awarded the Distinguished Service Cross.

The 121st Cavalry Squadron was awarded the Fourragère. For its action at Lunéville, the 121st Cavalry Squadron was recognized with the Croix de Guerre with Palm, and the Croix de guerre with Palm was awarded to entire 106th Cavalry Regiment for their gallantry and action at Caen-Falaise.

General Juin, Chief of the Free French General Staff,  later Marshall of France, wrote the citation, awarding the Croix de Guerre, with palm (order countersigned by  Charles de Gaulle) which  praised the 106th Cavalry Group's action fighting alongside the 2nd French Division into the Vosges Mountains:

Kappelman photographic collection 
T/5 Glenn Kappelman was among replacements who joined the unit on 1 February 1944, and he was able to take about 750 pictures of the unit's action during the remainder of the war. Against orders, Kapplelman had secreted a Kodak 616 camera in his gas mask during embarkation inspection in New York. Because he was a common soldier and not a professional photographer, and since cameras and film were rare among troops in combat, the photographs depict a soldier's everyday experience and are relatively unique among war photography.

Traveling in an M8 armored car, he stashed film in empty ammunition boxes, shooting nearly 100 rolls of film. On one occasion during the winter of 1945 near Lunéville, his M8 was damaged and his squadron was forced to hastily retreat. Unable to carry his boxes of film, he hid them in a nearby home under a table covered by a long tablecloth. He returned two days later to find the ammunition boxes undisturbed.

Fifty years later, he began to produce large format prints of selected images and donated copies to the United States Cavalry Museum at Ft. Riley, Kansas, and other collections. He also gave a set to the King of Belgium who had been 15 years old when he was rescued by Kappelman's unit from German captivity in 1945. Kappelman and fellow 106th veteran Art Barkis narrated a largely self-financed video documentary titled Through My Sights: A Gunner's View of WWII of the photographic collection in 1999. In 2003 he followed that with a book of the same name featuring a large number of the photos interspersed with his personal recollections 50 years later, along with excerpts from his wartime letters and diaries.

Kappelman reprinted the unit's 1945 history, "The 106th Cavalry Group in Europe 1944-1945" in 1999. He added additional information to the captions of some photographs.

Occupation duty 

The 106th remained in Austria as an occupation force until October 1945. Part of their responsibility was acting as an Honor Guard for King Leopold. The King was at the time a controversial figure because of his stand during the war and refusal to flee and set up a government in exile, but surrendered to the Germans. The 106th was billeted in Pension Appesbach next door to the King's chateau. They assisted with Military Police duties but otherwise relaxed, playing sports, swimming, boating, and sightseeing. Ironically, one member of B Troop, T/5 Myron Ricketts, having survived the war, died in a drowning accident during occupation duties.

In a speech to the Cavalry Group on Memorial Day, 30 May 1945, commanding officer Colonel Vennard Wilson described the Group's and specifically Troop B's accomplishments:

Post World War II 
The 106th Cavalry Regiment departed Austria for New York, United States on 1 October 1945 and was inactivated in Urbana, Illinois on 24 October 1945. In 1952 Companies A and C of the 106th Tank Battalion were headquartered at Camp Lincoln in Illinois.

Modern era 

The unit was reorganized on 1 February 1968 to consist of Troop E, an element of the 33d Infantry Brigade. Troop E 106 Cavalry was constituted as a scout element for the 33rd Separate Infantry Brigade, in Streator, Illinois, as a unit of the Illinois Army National Guard. The unit won several best unit citations during annual training with the 33rd Separate Infantry Brigade in the late 1980s. It served with distinction during a call up for Mississippi River floods in 1993. It was deactivated in 1995 and reconstituted as an air defense artillery unit.

In late 2006, the 33rd Brigade Combat Team of the Illinois Army National Guard was formed. A, B, and C Troops of 106th Cavalry Squadron along with its Headquarters Troop were included in the reorganization, forming the 33rd's Reconnaissance, Surveillance, and Target Acquisition squadron. Like their predecessors, they are responsible for reconnaissance, engaging the enemy with scout vehicles and anti-armor weapons, identifying and reporting enemy locations and activity, and providing enemy targeting information.

On 2 and 16 August 2008, about 100 Soldiers of the Headquarters and Headquarters Troop and Troop C, 2nd Squadron, 106th Cavalry were honored in a deployment ceremony prior to their deployment in support of Operation Enduring Freedom, to Afghanistan. As part of the 33rd Infantry Brigade Combat Team, they acted as mentor teams. They trained both the Afghan Army and Afghan National Police, conducting patrol and security missions. This deployment was a part of Combined Joint Task Force Phoenix VIII.

Current organization 
The Squadron currently consists of a Headquarters and Headquarters Troop and three cavalry Troops and is supported by Delta Company, 634th Brigade Support Battalion:
 Headquarters and Headquarters Troop (HHT), 2nd Squadron 106th Cavalry (2-106th Cavalry): Kewanee, IL
 A Troop, 2nd Squadron 106th Cavalry (A-2-106th Cavalry): Pontiac, IL
 B Troop, 2nd Squadron 106th Cavalry (B-2-106th Cavalry): Dixon, IL
 C Troop, 2nd Squadron 106th Cavalry (C-2-106th Cavalry): Aurora, IL
 D Company, 634th Brigade Support Battalion (D-634th BSB): Galva, IL

Notable personnel 
 Vennard Wilson, commanding officer, later Brigadier General and Assistant Division Commander, 25th Infantry Division
 James H. Polk, squadron commander, later regimental executive officer, and Commander in Chief, United States Army Europe from 1967 to 1971.

Heraldry and colors

Coat of arms 

Blazon

Shield   Per fess dovetailed Or and Gules, in base four fleurs-de-lis, three and one, of the first.

Crest   That for the regiments and separate battalions of the Illinois Army National Guard:  On a wreath of the colors Or and Gules upon a grassy field the blockhouse of old Fort Dearborn, Proper.

Motto  UTCUMQUE UBIQUE (Anywhere At Any Time).

Symbolism

Shield   The shield is divided per fess dovetailed Or and Gules (yellow and red), denoting that the organization has served as Artillery as well as Cavalry.  Red and yellow, being the Spanish colors, also indicate Spanish–American War service within the continental limits of the United States.  The fleurs-de-lis on the red portion symbolize the combat operations of the organization in Europe during World War I and World War II.

Crest The crest is that of the Illinois Army National Guard.

 Background

The coat of arms was originally approved for the 106th Cavalry Regiment, Illinois and Michigan National Guard on 17 December 1930.  The description wording was modified on 30 December 1932 to show the unit's correct period of service on the Mexican Border.  The unit was redesignated as the 106th Heavy Tank Battalion, Illinois and Michigan National Guard on 3 October 1949.  The shield was amended to delete the crest for organizations of the Michigan National Guard on 6 October 1949.  Four years later, on 19 October 1953 the unit was redesignated as the 106th Tank Battalion, Illinois National Guard.  The insignia was redesignated for the 106th Armor Regiment, Illinois National Guard on 13 December 1960.  It was redesignated once again as the 106th Cavalry Regiment, Illinois Army National Guard on 7 January 1965.  It was amended to change the symbolism of the shield of the coat of arms on 7 October 1969.

Distinctive unit insignia 
The unit device is a gold-colored metal and enamel device 1 1/32 inches (2.62 cm) in height overall consisting of a shield blazoned: Per fess dovetailed Or and Gules, in base four fleurs-de-lis, three and one, of the first.

The shield is divided per fess dovetailed Or and Gules (yellow and red), denoting that the organization has served as Artillery as well as Cavalry. Red and yellow, being the Spanish colors, also indicate Spanish–American War service within the continental limits of the United States. The fleurs-de-lis on the red portion symbolize the combat operations of the organization in Europe during World War I and World War II.

References

Further reading 
 
 Gleason, Bruce P., "Military Music in the 106th Cavalry: The Mounted Band of the Chicago Black Horse Troop, 1929–1940," Journal of the Illinois State Historical Society, 104 (Winter 2011), 301–35.

External links 

 Through My Sights: A Gunner's View of WWII (book and video on Amazon.com)
 U.S. Infantry Museum, Ft. Riley, Kansas
 Tribute to 2nd Lt. Theodore Rowman, 106th Cavalry, KIA 15 October, 1944 near Foret-de-Parroy, France
 In August 2011, the VOA Special English service of the Voice of America broadcast a report on the Bantam Jeep as part of its American Mosaic series. For a transcript and audio recording, see [The Jeep – One of the http://www.voanews.com/learningenglish/home/The-Jeep---One-of-the-Most-Famous-Vehicles-in-the-World—is-Celebrated-at-its-Birthplace-126870693.html The Jeep – One of the Most Famous Vehicles in the World – is Celebrated at its Birthplace].
 
 Mechanized Cavalry Home Page by Lou DiMarco

This article contains text that is a work of the U.S. military and therefore is in the public domain.

106
Military units and formations established in 1921
1921 establishments in Illinois
Military units and formations in Illinois
Military units and formations disestablished in 1945
Military units and formations established in 2006